Unleash the Fury is the fifteenth studio album by guitarist Yngwie Malmsteen, released on 26 July 2005 through Spitfire Records. Included on the album—which is an Enhanced CD—are three videos in QuickTime format. The album's title is a reference to an incident which occurred in 1988 on a flight to Tokyo during the Odyssey tour: having behaved obnoxiously whilst drunk, Malmsteen fell asleep and was later awoken by a woman pouring a jug of iced water on him. Enraged, he twice shouted "You've released the fucking fury!" (often misquoted as "unleashed"). The audio from this incident was caught on tape by drummer Anders Johansson, with bassist Barry Dunaway also being heard in the background.

Track listing

Personnel
Yngwie Malmsteen – vocals (co-lead on track 3 & lead on track 9), guitar, guitar synthesizer, keyboard, sitar, bass, background vocals, orchestration, arrangement, engineering, production
Doogie White – vocals (except track 9)
Joakim Svalberg – keyboard
Patrick Johansson – drums
Keith Rose – engineering
Mike Fraser – mixing
Mike Fuller – mastering

References

Yngwie Malmsteen albums
2005 albums
Spitfire Records albums